Jonás Trueba (born 1981) is a Spanish filmmaker.

Biography 
Prior to his directorial debut in a feature film with Every Song Is About Me (2010), he directed the 2000 short film Cero en conciencia and collaborated as a writer in films such as No Pain, No Gain (2001), Go Away from Me (2006) and The Dancer and the Thief (2009). Following the production of the 2013 film The Wishful Thinkers, Trueba founded a production company (Los Ilusos Films) alongside Javier Lafuente. He was recognised with the Ojo Crítico Award in 2016.

Filmography

References

External links 
 

1981 births
Living people
Spanish film directors
21st-century Spanish screenwriters
Spanish male screenwriters